The women's discus throw event at the 2015 Summer Universiade was held on 8 and 9 July at the Gwangju Universiade Main Stadium.

Medalists

Results

Qualification
Qualification: 55.00 m (Q) or at least 12 best (q) qualified for the final.

Final

References

Discus
2015 in women's athletics
2015